The Channel Football Club was an Australian rules football club that last played in the Old Scholars Football Association (Tas), also known as Old Scholars, from 2009 to 2015. 
Previous to that it was a member of the Southern Football League from 1996 to 2008 and the Huon Football Association from 1967 to 1995. 
The Channel Football Club's emblem was the Saints, although it changed to the Sharks from 2009 to 2015. 
Their home ground, Snug Park, was situated right alongside the beach at the end of Beach Road, Snug.

The Formation of Channel Football Club
The Channel Football Club was formed in 1967 after the disastrous 1967 Tasmanian bushfires, which decimated the Channel region. With the demise of the Margate, Kettering, Snug and Woodbridge Football Clubs, the Channel Football Club was formed to incorporate all four of these clubs, Channel would be lining up for the 1967 season in the Huon Football Association. Shortly afterwards, a set of red, white and black playing jumpers were donated to the club by the Longley Football Club, which would no longer be needing them as it had recently merged with Kingston (now Kingborough). Channel adopted the Saints emblem and Red, White & Black playing strip and were firstly based at Margate before moving to the club's present Snug Park headquarters. Channel left the Huon Football Association at the end of 1995 and joined the then STFL (now SFL) in 1996 whereby they won the League's inaugural Senior premiership.

The Struggle and Joining the Old Scholars
After losing their final twenty three consecutive matches in the SFL Regional League, including a winless 2008 season, the Channel Football Club applied to join the more social Old Scholars Football Association.  
In January 2009, the Channel Football Club was granted permission to join the Old Scholars Football Association. The club feared that they would be no match for former Premier League clubs rejoining the same competition as them, and that the resulting beatings they would've suffered could well have spelled the end of the Channel Football Club's existence.
After a number of years of continuous struggle in the OSFA, including losing their first forty consecutive matches in the competition, the club battled on until the end of the 2015 season. 
Over the Summer break, Channel found itself with a critical shortage of players and in March 2016 it announced that the club would cease to exist effective immediately. 
Channel's final match in its existence was on Saturday, 29 August 2015 at Snug Park in the final roster round of that season's Old Scholars Football Association when they hosted eventual premier, Richmond. 
Richmond won the match by 45-points, 15.13 (103) to Channel 9.4 (58).

Stadiums, Achievements & Club Records
Club Formed- 1967Colours - Red, Black & White.Emblem - The SaintsSong - There's A Team On The Track, Dressed In Red, White & Black.Entry to Huon Football Association - 1967Entry to Southern Football League - 1996Entry to Old Scholars Football Association - 2009Old Scholars Football Association Premierships - NilOld Scholars Football Association Runners Up - NilSouthern Football League Premierships - 1996Southern Football League Runners Up - NilHuon Football Association Premierships - 1975, 1977, 1978, 1981, 1983, 1986, 1988, 1990Peter Hodgeman Medallists - Andrew Beveridge (1998); M.Gowans (2005)Club Record Games Holder - 411 by Ken SmithClub Record Attendance - 4,149 v Kingston (Kingborough Tigers) - 1996 SFL Grand Final at Abbotsfield Park.Club Record Score''' - 60.36 (396) vs Lachlan 1.0 (6) at Snug Park in 1996

References

External links
AFL Southern Tasmania
Info on Old Scholars

Australian rules football clubs in Tasmania